Markus Müller (born 22 December 1966) is a Swiss gymnast. He competed in eight events at the 1992 Summer Olympics.

References

1966 births
Living people
Swiss male artistic gymnasts
Olympic gymnasts of Switzerland
Gymnasts at the 1992 Summer Olympics
Place of birth missing (living people)